The 1979 Soviet football championship was the 48th seasons of competitive football in the Soviet Union. Spartak Moscow won the Top League championship becoming the Soviet domestic champions for the tenth time.

Honours

Notes = Number in parentheses is the times that club has won that honour. * indicates new record for competition

Soviet Union football championship

Top League

First League

Second League

Group 1

Group 2

Group 3

Group 4

Group 5

Group 6

Top goalscorers

Top League
 Vitaliy Starukhin (Shakhter Donetsk) – 26 goals

First League
Stepan Yurchyshyn (Karpaty Lvov) – 42 goals

References

External links
 1979 Soviet football championship. RSSSF